The charm quark, charmed quark or c quark (from its symbol, c) is the third-most massive of all quarks, a type of elementary particle. Charm quarks are found in hadrons, which are subatomic particles made of quarks. Examples of hadrons containing charm quarks include the J/ψ meson, D mesons, charmed Sigma baryons, and other charmed particles.

Like all quarks, the charm quark is an elementary fermion with spin , and experiences all four fundamental interactions: gravitation, electromagnetism, weak interactions, and strong interactions. The antiparticle of the charm quark is the charm antiquark (sometimes called anticharm quark or simply anticharm), which differs from it only in that some of its properties have equal magnitude but opposite sign.

The existence of a fourth quark had been speculated by a number of authors around 1964 (for instance by James Bjorken and Sheldon Glashow), but its prediction is usually credited to Sheldon Glashow, John Iliopoulos and Luciano Maiani in 1970 (see GIM mechanism). Glashow is quoted as saying, "We called our construct the 'charmed quark', for we were fascinated and pleased by the symmetry it brought to the subnuclear world." The first charmed particle (a particle containing a charm quark) to be discovered was the J/ψ meson. It was discovered in 1974 by a team at the Stanford Linear Accelerator Center (SLAC), led by Burton Richter, and one at the Brookhaven National Laboratory (BNL), led by Samuel Ting.

Hadrons containing charm quarks 

Some of the hadrons containing charm quarks include:
 D mesons contain a charm quark (or its antiparticle) and an up or down quark.
  mesons contain a charm quark and a strange quark.
 There are many charmonium states, for example the  particle. These consist of a charm quark and its antiparticle.
 Charmed baryons have been observed, and are named in analogy with strange baryons (e.g. ).

See also
Quark model

References

Further reading

Quarks
Elementary particles